Sangis River (Swedish: Sangisälven or Sangis älv) is a river in Norrbotten in Sweden.

References

Drainage basins of the Baltic Sea
Rivers of Norrbotten County